Racy is the second studio album by American rock band Hooray for Earth. It was released in July 2014 under Dovecote Records.

Track listing

References

2014 albums